Mis Canciones, Mis Amigos ("My Songs, My Friends") is the title of a Compilation album released by Mexican singer-songwriter Juan Gabriel on October 6, 2009. This is a 2-disc compilation album, with the first disc featuring Juan Gabriel songs and the second disc featuring songs that Juan Gabriel wrote that were covered by other artists.

Track listing

Disc 1

Disc 2

References

External links 
official website on Universal Music
[] Mis Canciones, Mis Amigos on allmusic.com

2009 compilation albums
Juan Gabriel compilation albums
Spanish-language albums